The BMW 116 was a piston aircraft engine developed by BMW in the 1930s. Development work stopped in 1937. The BMW 116 engine was initially known as the BMW XII.

Specifications (BMW 116)

See also

References

 Fred Jakobs, Robert Kröschel and Christian Pierer. "BMW aero engines". BMW Group Classic, 2009 

BMW aircraft engines
1930s aircraft piston engines